Persuasion was the planned fifth studio solo album by Adam Ant, planned for 1992–1993 but never released. The album has however surfaced as bootlegs, and nowadays circulates on file sharing networks. This album is one of the 20 written about in The Greatest Music Never Sold by Dan Leroy, a book that revealed information on the lost recordings of many famous musicians. Ant has also discussed the doomed production in his autobiography and it has been featured in the online edition of Classic Pop magazine.

Production
The album featured a collaboration between the Ant/Marco Pirroni partnership and Bernard Edwards, longtime bass player with the disco group Chic.  Edwards' Chic bandmate Tony Thompson played drums on most of the album, except for the title track plus "Headgear" and "Survival of the Fetish", which all featured drummer Dave Ruffy, who had previous worked with Pirroni under Sinéad O'Connor. Also featured on the album were Cameo guitarist Larry Blackmon (on the track "Little Devil") and former Adam and the Ants bassist Leigh Gorman.

Non-release and tour
Despite the US Top 20 success of the single "Room At The Top" from previous MCA album Manners & Physique, the label rejected the album and, dropped Ant as the album had failed to achieve gold status in the US.

Following the rejection of the album by MCA, Ant together with a new band including Pirroni and Ruffy, embarked on the 1993 Persuasion Tour to attract a new label for the album, including a three-night stand at Los Angeles' Henry Fonda Theatre. Although Ant was able to sign to new label Capitol Records in the US and EMI in the UK, MCA proved unwilling to let go of the Persuasion master tapes. A new album Wonderful, was recorded instead with the band from the tour.<ref>sleevenotes by Adam Ant - 'Adam Ant Live, Sony Music 1994 packaged with copies of Antmusic: The Very Best of Adam Ant Sony Music 1994 edition</ref>

Legacy
Seventeen years later, onstage at the Scala on 30 April 2010, Ant recalled the events of the non-release of the album and announced his intention to release it soon with artwork by Jamie Hewlett. A concert at the Electric Ballroom, tentatively scheduled for 12 August 2010 but which never materialised, was due to have featured songs from the album.

Interviewed in 2001, Marco Pirroni discussed Persuasion'''s non-release:

Track listing
"Persuasion" (4:10)
"Headgear" (4:03)
"All Girl Action" (4:23)
"Brain Candy" (4:17)
"Obsession" (4:00)
"Little Devil" (3:48)
"Sexatise You" (4:04)
"Survival of the Fetish" (4:29)
"Charge of the Heavy Brigade" (4:37)
"Don't Knock It ('til you got it) (4:10)

The following track which also circulates with the above on bootleg copies, was not planned for inclusion on the main album.
"Seems To Me" (4:34)

References

Adam Ant albums
Unreleased albums